Mamurius is a genus of leaf-footed bugs in the family Coreidae. There are at least two described species in Mamurius.

Species
These two species belong to the genus Mamurius:
 Mamurius cubanus Barber & Bruner, 1947
 Mamurius mopsus Stål, 1862

References

Further reading

 

Coreinae
Articles created by Qbugbot
Coreidae genera